Commercial character design is the process of creating a character and utilising it to enhance or publicise a commercial entity through design.

Design process 
Examples of characters which have been designed to be used in a commercial application are found throughout the modern world, on advertisement billboards, murals, graphic marketing within interior spaces and within recent years, as animations on the Internet. A character can appear in two dimension (2D) or as a three-dimensional design (3D) as modelled using a computer or traditionally sculpted. Commercial entities use characters which are designed to embody a brand image or enhance a sales campaign.

Well-known designers 
Well known design companies include:
Walt Disney Company (animators and cartoonists)
Leo Burnett Worldwide (advertisers)

Communication design